The Cathedral of Saint Joseph  is a Catholic cathedral and parish church located in Sioux Falls, South Dakota, United States. It is the seat of the Diocese of Sioux Falls.  Since 1974 the cathedral has been a contributing property in the Cathedral Historic District on the National Register of Historic Places.

History

The Cathedral of St. Joseph traces its history to the establishment of St. Michael's Church, Sioux Falls' first Catholic parish.  It was founded in 1881 and a wooden building was constructed for a church.  Two years later a larger brick church was built.  It became the Pro-Cathedral when Bishop Martin Marty, who was Vicar Apostolic of the Dakota Territory, arrived in Sioux Falls in 1889.  On November 12, of the same year Pope Leo XIII established the Diocese of Sioux Falls, and St. Michael's become the cathedral for the new diocese.

Bishop Thomas O'Gorman succeeded Bishop Marty in 1896 and in time desired a new and larger cathedral.  He was a friend of Archbishop John Ireland of St. Paul and he attended the dedication of the Cathedral of St. Paul in 1915.  He conferred with the architect of the new St. Paul cathedral Emmanuel Masqueray, who was hired to design the present cathedral in Sioux Falls.  St. Michael's was moved and the rectory was  torn down.  Construction of the new cathedral was begun in 1915.  Masqueray died in 1917 and shortages during World War I slowed construction.  Edwin Lundie, Masqueray's chief assistant, took over the project.  The first Mass in the unfinished cathedral took place on December 8, 1918, and it was dedicated after its completion on May 7, 1919.

The structure has been altered over the years.  A Kilgen pipe organ was installed in 1935.  A fire in the lower church did significant damage to the cathedral in 1942.  Conrad Schmitt Studios decorated the interior the following year, and the marble high altar and tester were installed in 1946.  The frosted glass windows were replaced by French stenciled stained glass windows in 1947.  A major interior restoration took place between 1970 and 1974.  A new free-standing altar was installed at that time.  In 2004 the Sacred Heart Chapel was created in the sacristy and the basement was renovated to become a parish hall.  Another major renovation of the cathedral interior was completed in 2011.

See also
List of Catholic cathedrals in the United States
List of cathedrals in the United States

References

External links

Official Cathedral Site
Diocese of Sioux Falls Official Site

Churches in the Roman Catholic Diocese of Sioux Falls
Christian organizations established in 1915
Roman Catholic churches completed in 1919
Sioux Falls
Renaissance Revival architecture in South Dakota
Tourist attractions in Sioux Falls, South Dakota
Churches in Minnehaha County, South Dakota
National Register of Historic Places in Sioux Falls, South Dakota
Historic district contributing properties in South Dakota
Churches on the National Register of Historic Places in South Dakota
20th-century Roman Catholic church buildings in the United States
1919 establishments in South Dakota